Jaroslav Vacek (26 June 1943 – 23 January 2017) was director of the Institute of South and Central Asia and former dean of the Philosophical Faculty at the Charles University in Prague, where he founded the teaching and research of Mongolian as a new subject. He was a member of the Czech Oriental Society, the Prague Linguistic Circle, and The Learned Society. He translated the Bhagavad Gita from Sanskrit into Czech. Vacek was interested mainly in linguistic problems on the Indian linguistic area and the Dravidian and Altaic relationships, where he applied new research approach. He also spoke fluent Tamil and was an authority on Tamil and Dravidian linguistics.

Membership and positions in international organizations and societies 

European Association of South Asian Studies, Leiden (co-founder and Vice-President, the Association was founded in Prague in 1997)

Member of editorial boards 

International Journal of Dravidian Linguistics, Trivandrum
India PILC Journal of Dravidic Studies, Pondicherry, India

Awards 

1997 – Golden Medal of Charles University – Rector of Charles University
2006 – Memorial Medal of Charles University – Rector of Charles University
2012 – Indian Presidential Award – Kural Peedam Award (Tamil: குறள் பீடம் விருது) for His contribution to the Classical Language of Tamil

Personal life 

He has been frequently visiting India, especially Hyderabad and Chennai for his research work.

Selected writings 
Vacek, J., Dravidian and Altaic ‘Water – Viscosity – Cold’. An Etymological and Typological Model. Charles University, Karolinum Press, Prague 2002, 359 pp.; ; ISSN 0587-1255
Lubsangdorji, J., Vacek, J., Colloquial Mongolian. An introductory intensive course. Vol. 1. Triton, Prague 2004, XI + 424 pp.; ; Vol. 2. Triton, Prague 2004, VII + 62 pp.; 
Vacek, J., Dravidian and Altaic – In Search of a New Paradigm. Archiv Orientální, Vol. 72, 2004, pp. 384–453; ISSN 0044-8699; reprint: International Journal of Dravidian Linguistics (Trivandrum, India), Vol. XXXV, No.1, January 2006, pp. 29–96.  Reg. No. 22651/72
 Vacek J., Oberfalzerova (eds.): MONGOLICA PRAGENSIA ‘02, Ethnolinguistics and Sociolinguistics in Synchrony and Diachrony. 2002 Triton 
Triton  2003 
Triton  2004 
Triton  2005 
Triton 2006 
Vacek J.: A Neytal Feature to Be Found in the Meghadúta? (in Pandanus ’98: Flowers, Nature, Semiotics – Kavya and Sangam. ) 
Vacek J. : Types of formulaic expressions in Cangam – A preliminary survey of their structural patterns (in Pandanus ’01: Research in Indian Classical Literature) 
Vacek, Nature as Symbolic Code in Old Tamil Love Poetry. (in Pandanus ’03: Nature Symbols in Literature. ) 
Vacek J.: Old Tamil literary formulae connected with mullai (attributive phrases) 
Vacek J.: Old Tamil literary formulae connected with mullai (2. mullai as attribute, complex phrases, anthropomorphic contexts) in (Pandanus ’04: Nature in Literature. )
Vacek J.:“Parrot” in Old Tamil Sangam literature – formulas and images (in Pandanus ’05: Nature in Literature, Myth and Ritual. ) 
Vacek J.: The dog in Sangam literature – as a part of the description of nature (in Pandanus ’06. Nature in Literature and Ritual. ) 
Vacek J.: The pig in Sangam literature – images and textual properties (in Pandanus ’07: Nature in Literature, Art, Myth and Ritual. ) ISSN 1802-7997
Vacek J.: The rat in Sangam literature – as a part of the description of nature (in Pandanus ’08/2: Nature in Literature, Art, Myth and Ritual. ) ISSN 1802-7997
 Vacek J. (ed.) *Pandanus ’05, Nature in Literature, Myth and Ritual. Charles University, Faculty of Arts; Signeta, Praha 2005, 294 pp.;  previous volumes (some with co-editors and international co-operation) ’98, 2000, ’01, ’02, ’03, ’04, ’05
Vacek, J., Subramanian, S. V., A Tamil Reader, Introducing Sangam Literature. International Institute of Tamil Studies, Madras 1989, Vol.1, LIV+134 pp.; Vol.2, 130 pp.
Zbavitel, D., Vacek, J., Průvodce dějinami staroindické literatury [Handbook of old Indian literature]. Arca JiMfa, Třebíč 1996, 537 pp. (chapters on old Tamil literature, pp. 174–207, 349–363, 394–421, 454–461);

Translated books by Jaroslav Vacek 
 Čilaγun-u bičig, A Mongolian Prophetic Text. Edited, translated and commented upon by J. Lubsangdorji and J. Vacek. Studia Orientalia Pragensia XX. Charles University, Prague 1997, 87 pp.; 
Vásanti,  [Aakaasa viidugal]. From Tamil translated by Jaroslav Vacek. Triton, Praha 2000, 199 pp.; 
Bhagavadgíta [Bhagavadgita, or the Song of Krishna]. Votobia, Praha 2000 (2nd edition), 243 pp. (translation from Sanskrit and samples from old commentaries; jointly with J. Filipský);

References

External links 
 The Learned Society
 European Association of South Asian Studies
International Journal of Dravidian Linguistics
Seminar of Mongolian Studies
 Pandanus Homepage
Institute of South and Central Asia
Interview with Prof. Jaroslav Vacek (video)
Czech Professor Jaroslav Vacek addressing in Tamil (video)

1943 births
2017 deaths
Academic staff of Charles University
Czech Indologists